Seyqaldeh (also Romanized as Şeyqaldeh and Seyqal Deh; also known as Şeqaldeh, Şeyqaldī, Sigaldi, and Sighaldi) is a village in Khorgam Rural District, Khorgam District, Rudbar County, Gilan Province, Iran. At the 2006 census, its population was 113, in 41 families.

References 

Populated places in Rudbar County